Gorgeh Choqa (also Romanized as Gorgeh Choqā and Gargeh Cheqā; also known as Gareh Choqā) is a village in Baladarband Rural District, in the Central District of Kermanshah County, Kermanshah Province, Iran. At the 2006 census, its population was 15, in 4 families.

References 

Populated places in Kermanshah County